Howard G. Bruenn (1905 – July 25, 1995) was an American medical doctor who served as Physician to the President and attended to President Franklin D. Roosevelt in the year before his death.

Biography 
Bruenn was born in Youngstown, Ohio. He graduated from Columbia College in 1925 and Johns Hopkins School of Medicine in 1929. He interned at Boston City Hospital and completed his residency at the Columbia University College of Physicians & Surgeons.

He joined the U.S. Navy in 1942 and was commissioned a Lieutenant Commander.

Bruenn was transferred to Bethesda Naval Hospital, where he became chief of cardiology. After giving President Franklin D. Roosevelt a routine health check, he was assigned to be the President's physician. He traveled with the President wherever he went, including the Yalta Conference. He was one of the only three people present in Roosevelt's personal quarters in the Little White House when he died on April 12, 1945.

After the President's death, Bruenn returned to private practice until his retirement in 1975 as consultant emeritus and retired chief of the Vanderbilt Clinic at the NewYork-Presbyterian Hospital.

Bruenn, a lifelong resident of Riverdale, Bronx, died on July 29, 1995, in his summer home in Sorrento, Maine at 90 years old.

References 

1905 births
1995 deaths
People from Youngstown, Ohio
Columbia College (New York) alumni
Johns Hopkins School of Medicine alumni
Physicians to the President
Franklin D. Roosevelt administration personnel
Physicians from Ohio
20th-century American physicians